Muhammad Arif bin Mohamed Anwar (born 14 March 1995) is a Malaysian professional footballer who plays as a forward for Malaysia Super League club PDRM.

Club career

Petaling Jaya Rangers
On 20 November 2017, Arif  signed a contract with Petaling Jaya Rangers.

Career statistics

Club

Honours

Kuala Lumpur
Malaysia Premier League 
Champion(1): 2017

References

External links
 

1995 births
Living people
People from Selangor
Malaysian footballers
Petaling Jaya Rangers F.C. players
Kuala Lumpur City F.C. players
UiTM FC players
Terengganu FC players
Malaysian people of Malay descent
Association football forwards